Bhagavan is a 1986 Indian Malayalam film, directed by Baby and produced by K. G. Mohan. The film stars Menaka, Madhuri, Meena Ganesh and Premji in the lead roles. The film has musical score by M. S. Viswanathan.

Cast
Menaka
Madhuri
Meena Ganesh
Premji
Ramu
Saleema
Shanavas
Sreenath
Master Dax

Soundtrack
The music was composed by M. S. Viswanathan and the lyrics were written by Poovachal Khader.

References

External links
 

1986 films
1980s Malayalam-language films
Films scored by M. S. Viswanathan
Films directed by Baby (director)